Lockwood is an unincorporated community in Merrick County, Nebraska, United States.

History
Lockwood was a station on the Union Pacific Railroad.

A post office was established at Lockwood in 1874 and has since closed.

References

Unincorporated communities in Merrick County, Nebraska
Unincorporated communities in Nebraska